"Nothin'" is the lead single from American rapper N.O.R.E.'s third studio album, God's Favorite (2002). The song was produced by the Neptunes and features Neptunes member Pharrell Williams performing the song's hook. "Nothin'" reached  10 on the Billboard Hot 100, surpassing his 1998 hit "Superthug" (also produced by the Neptunes) as his biggest solo hit. At the end of 2002, "Nothin'" was ranked No. 37 on the Billboard Year-End Hot 100 singles of 2002. Ja Rule and Mike Epps appear in the song's music video.

Composition
Produced by the Neptunes, "Nothin'" was recorded by N.O.R.E. for his third studio album God's Favorite (2002), with songwriting being credited to N.O.R.E. and Neptunes members Pharrell Williams and Chad Hugo. Williams performs the song's hook. The lyrics contain a nod to Smash Mouth's 1999 song "All Star"; the song's writer, Smash Mouth guitarist Greg Camp, was later credited as an additional songwriter on "Nothin'".

Remix
The official remix was later released and features Pharrell Williams, P. Diddy, Foxy Brown, Capone, Final Chapter, & Musaliny-N-Maze.

Legacy
In 2022, Spin listed "Nothin'" as the 44th best song of 2002. The same year, it was sampled on rapper Armani White's song "Billie Eilish". White and N.O.R.E. performed a medley of both songs at the 2022 edition of the BET Hip Hop Awards.

Track listing
A-side
 "Nothin'" (album version)
 "Nahmeanuheard" (remix) (featuring Cam'ron, Capone, Cassidy and Fat Joe)

B-side
 "Nothin'" (instrumental)
 "Nahmeanuheard" (remix instrumental)

Charts

Weekly charts

Year-end charts

Release history

References

2002 singles
2002 songs
Def Jam Recordings singles
N.O.R.E. songs
Song recordings produced by the Neptunes
Songs written by Greg Camp
Songs written by Chad Hugo
Songs written by N.O.R.E.
Songs written by Pharrell Williams